Nanluogu Xiang is a station on Line 6 and Line 8 of the Beijing Subway in central Beijing. The station opened on December 30, 2012 to Line 6 service, and to Line 8 service in December 2013. It is located near to the south entrance of the Nanluoguxiang alley, after which it is named.  It will also become a transfer station for the Planned Phase 2 of Line 3 in the future.

This station features split platforms, a unique feature in the Beijing Subway.

Station layout 
Both the line 6 and 8 stations have underground stacked side platforms. However, it can be considered as 2 entire split island platforms the platforms themselves aren't separate from each other. The southbound line 8 and eastbound line 6 platforms are located under the northbound line 8 and westbound line 6 platforms.

Exits
There are four exits, lettered A, B, E, and F. Exits B and E are accessible.

Gallery

Line 6

Line 8

References

External links
 

Railway stations in China opened in 2012
Beijing Subway stations in Dongcheng District